Zim is an unincorporated place in McDavitt Township, St. Louis County, Minnesota, United States.

Geography
The community is located 14 miles southwest of the city of Eveleth at the junction of Saint Louis County Highway 7 and County Road 27. The Saint Louis River is nearby.

History

A post office called Zim was established in 1899, and remained in operation until 1990. The community derives its name from a logging camp run by a lumberman named Zimmerman who worked in the area.

Arts and culture

The nearby Sax–Zim Bog area is home to one of the world's best birdwatching places and the site of the annual Sax–Zim Winter Birding Festival held in February. The bog was named for Zim and the nearby community of Sax.

Zim is home to noted rock music transcriber Jordan Baker, who has authored songbooks for Dream Theater, Steve Vai and Metallica.

References

 Rand McNally Road Atlas – 2007 edition – Minnesota entry
 Official State of Minnesota Highway Map – 2011/2012 edition

Unincorporated communities in Minnesota
Unincorporated communities in St. Louis County, Minnesota